Justin Schmitt (born 9 October 1974) is a former Australian rules football field umpire who officiated in the Australian Football League. He umpired 363 career games in the AFL, debuting in 1997 and retiring at the end of 2018.

References

External links 
Justin Schmitt at AFL Tables

Australian Football League umpires
1974 births
Living people
Place of birth missing (living people)